The 2017 WestJet Players' Championship was held from April 11 to 16 at Ryerson's Mattamy Athletic Centre in Toronto. It was the seventh men's and sixth women's Grand Slam event of the 2016–17 curling season.

Sweden's Niklas Edin won the men's event, becoming the first non-Canadian skip to do so. On the women's side, Winnipeg's Jennifer Jones won her six Players' title, the most for any female skip.

Qualification
The top 12 ranked men's and women's teams on the World Curling Tour's year to date ranking as of March 13 qualify:

Men's
Top men's teams as of March 13:
 Niklas Edin
 Brad Gushue
 Reid Carruthers
 Brad Jacobs
 John Epping
 Mike McEwen
 Kevin Koe
 Steve Laycock
 Kyle Smith
 John Morris
 Thomas Ulsrud
 Peter de Cruz
 Brendan Bottcher

Women's
Top 12 women's teams as of March 13:
 Rachel Homan
 Anna Hasselborg
 Jennifer Jones
 Silvana Tirinzoni
 Allison Flaxey
 Valerie Sweeting
 Casey Scheidegger
 Eve Muirhead
 Michelle Englot
 Wang Bingyu
 Margaretha Sigfridsson
 Tracy Fleury

Men

Teams
The teams are listed as follows:

Round-robin standings
Final round-robin standings

Round-robin results

Draw 1
Tuesday, April 11, 7:00 pm

Draw 3
Wednesday, April 12, 12:00 pm

Draw 5
Wednesday, April 12, 7:00 pm

Draw 6
Thursday, April 13, 8:30 am

Draw 7
Thursday, April 13, 12:00 pm

Draw 8
Thursday, April 13, 3:30 pm

Draw 9
Thursday, April 13, 7:00 pm

Draw 10
Friday, April 14, 8:30 am

Draw 11
Friday, April 14, 12:00 pm

Draw 12
Friday, April 14, 3:30 pm

Tiebreaker
Friday, April 14, 7:00 pm

Tiebreaker 2
Saturday, April 15, 11:00 am

Playoffs

Quarterfinals
Saturday, April 15, 3:00 pm

Semifinals
Sunday, April 16, 11:00 am

Final
Sunday, April 16, 3:00 pm

Women

Teams
The teams are listed as follows:

Round-robin standings
Final round-robin standings

Round-robin results

Draw 1
Tuesday, April 11, 7:00 pm

Draw 2
Wednesday, April 12, 8:30 am

Draw 4
Wednesday, April 12, 3:30 pm

Draw 5
Wednesday, April 12, 7:00 pm

Draw 6
Thursday, April 13, 8:30 am

Draw 7
Thursday, April 13, 12:00 pm

Draw 8
Thursday, April 13, 3:30 pm

Draw 9
Thursday, April 13, 7:00pm

Draw 10
Friday, April 14, 8:30 am

Draw 11
Friday, April 14, 12:00 pm

Draw 12
Friday, April 14, 3:30 pm

Draw 13
Friday, April 14, 7:00 pm

Tiebreaker
Saturday, April 15, 11:00 am

Playoffs

Quarterfinals
Saturday, April 15, 7:30 pm

Semifinals
Sunday, April 16, 11:00 am

Final
Sunday, April 16, 7:00 pm

Notes

References

Players' Championship
Players' Championship
Curling in Toronto
Sports competitions in Toronto
Players' Championship
April 2017 sports events in Canada